MTV The Return of the Rock is a compilation album released in 2000. It coincided with MTV's Return of the Rock tour.

It peaked at #42 on the Billboard charts.

Track listing

References

2000 compilation albums